Tim Williams may refer to:

 Tim Williams (actor) (born 1966), American actor
 Tim Williams (born 1966), English composer, conductor and orchestrator for film, TV and video games 
 Tim Williams (folk musician) (born 1979), American singer-songwriter 
 Tim Williams (American football), American football player
 Tim Williams (rock musician) (born 1982), American indie rock singer-songwriter
 Tim Williams, heavy metal singer (Bloodsimple, Vision of Disorder)
 Tim Williams (Tangle), fictional character on the TV series Tangle